Billinge Green Halt railway station was located in Davenham, Cheshire, England. The station was opened by the London and North Western Railway on 1 October 1914, the station closed on 2 March 1942.

References 

Disused railway stations in Cheshire
Railway stations in Great Britain opened in 1914
Railway stations in Great Britain closed in 1942
Former London and North Western Railway stations